Lucas Oil Stadium is a multi-purpose stadium in downtown Indianapolis, Indiana, United States. It replaced the RCA Dome as the home field of the National Football League (NFL)'s Indianapolis Colts and opened on August 16, 2008. The stadium was constructed to allow the removal of the RCA Dome and expansion of the Indiana Convention Center on its site. It is located on the south side of South Street, a block south of the former site of the RCA Dome. The stadium's naming rights belong to the Lucas Oil corporation. The venue also serves as the home for the Drum Corps International Championships.

Architectural firm HKS, Inc. was responsible for the stadium's design, with Walter P Moore working as the Structural Engineer of Record. The stadium features a retractable roof and a large retractable window on one end, allowing the Colts to play both indoors and outdoors. The field surface was originally FieldTurf, but was replaced with Shaw Sports Momentum Pro in 2018. The exterior of the new stadium is faced with a reddish-brown brick trimmed with Indiana limestone, similar to several other sports venues in the area, including Gainbridge Fieldhouse, Hinkle Fieldhouse and Fairgrounds Coliseum.

Name
The home field of the Indianapolis Colts for 24 seasons (1984–2007) was the RCA Dome, which was part of the Indiana Convention Center. In 2006, prior to the new stadium's construction, Lucas Oil, manufacturer and distributor of automotive oil, additives and lubricants, secured the naming rights for the stadium at a cost of $122 million over the next 20 years.

Features

The stadium offers 139 suites, two club lounges, two exhibit halls and 12 meeting rooms. An underground walkway directly connects the stadium to the Indiana Convention Center.

Other features include:
 of exhibit space
 7 locker rooms
 11 indoor truck docks
 14 escalators
 11 passenger elevators
 2 accessible pedestrian ramps

Retractable roof
The stadium's retractable roof can open or close in about 11 minutes. It is composed of two panels that each weigh . The home team determines if the roof is to be opened or closed 90 minutes before kickoff.

Retractable window

The retractable north window offers a view of downtown Indianapolis during games, concerts and other events due to the stadium's angled position on the city block.

Gate sponsorship
The four gates leading into Lucas Oil Stadium are each named for a sponsoring corporation:
 Lucas Oil (north gate)
 Huntington Bank (west gate)
 Indianapolis Colts (south gate)
 Verizon Wireless (east gate)

The ground-level concourses of their respective gates feature banners and floor coverings with the corporations' logos, advertisements and merchandise displays.

Events

Annual events include:
Bands of America Grand National Championships and Indianapolis Super Regionals
Big Ten Football Championship Game
Circle City Classic
Drum Corps International World Championships
FDIC International (Firefighting Convention)
IHSAA Indiana State Football Championships
ISSMA Band State Finals
Monster Energy Supercross 
Monster Jam
NFL Draft Combine
National FFA Convention

Upcoming events include:
NCAA Men's Basketball Final Four (April 2026 & April 2029)
2024 United States Swimming Olympic Trials

Significant past events included:
Super Bowl XLVI (February 5, 2012)
Kenny Chesney concerts (2008, 2009, 2012, 2015)
Chelsea vs. Inter Milan (International Champions Cup) (August 1, 2013)
NCAA Men's Basketball Final Four (2010, 2015, 2021)
One Direction – On The Road Again Tour (July 31, 2015)
Gen Con 50 (August 2017)
North American Youth Congress 2017 (July–August 2017)
U2 – The Joshua Tree Tour 2017 (September 10, 2017)
Taylor Swift's Reputation Stadium Tour (September 15, 2018)
2021 Big Ten men's basketball tournament (March 10–14, 2021)
NCAA men's basketball tournament, including the Final Four (March–April 2021)
Guns N' Roses – Guns N' Roses 2020 Tour (September 8, 2021)
College Football Playoff National Championship (January 10, 2022)

Football
The first games played at Lucas Oil Stadium occurred on August 22, 2008, and were part of the PeyBack Classic, featuring Indiana high school football games between Noblesville High School and Fishers High School in Game 1, followed by New Palestine High School and Whiteland Community High School in Game 2. On November 26, 2008, Cardinal Ritter High School became the first high school to win a state championship on the field, beating Sheridan High School 34–27 for the class A state title. The Colts faced the Chicago Bears in a rematch of Super Bowl XLI in their first regular season game in the stadium.

Soccer
The stadium hosted its first soccer game on August 1, 2013, when Chelsea played Inter Milan in a first-round game of the International Champions Cup, drawing 41,983 fans.

From 2018 to 2020, Lucas Oil Stadium served as the home field of the United Soccer League's Indy Eleven, replacing the venue the team used while in the North American Soccer League, Carroll Stadium.

Basketball
In March 2021, various rounds of the 2021 NCAA Division I men's basketball tournament were moved to Lucas Oil Stadium as part of the NCAA's decision to consolidate the tournament into sites in Indiana. Lucas Oil hosted games in all rounds (except the "First Four"), including the Final Four and championship game every 5 years up until 2040.

Entertainment
On August 9, 2006, Drum Corps International (DCI) announced that it would move its corporate offices to Indianapolis and that the DCI World Championships would be the inaugural event for the stadium and would be held at Lucas Oil Stadium every year through 2018. In 2015, Drum Corps International and the city of Indianapolis announced a 10-year contract extension, allowing the World Championships to continue through 2028. The competition was held for the first time at Lucas Oil Stadium in 2009.

Other regular events include the Bands of America Grand National Championships and the Indiana Marching Band State Finals, both major events for the city in marching band competitions.

Concerts

Financing
The total cost of Lucas Oil Stadium was $720 million. The stadium is being financed with funds raised by the State of Indiana and the City of Indianapolis, with the Indianapolis Colts providing $100 million. Marion County has raised taxes for food and beverage sales, auto rental taxes, innkeeper's taxes, and admission taxes for its share of the costs. Meanwhile, there has been an increase in food and beverage taxes in the eight surrounding doughnut counties (with the exception of Morgan County) and the sale of Colts license plates.

The County Commissioners of each county voted whether to levy the 1% food and beverage tax proposed by Marion County. Sweetening the deal for those counties was the fact that half of the revenue from the tax would stay in the respective county. Morgan County was the only county to turn down the offer, yet in a later vote, it levied its own 1% tax – thus keeping all of its additional generated revenue.

Budget shortfall
In August 2006, the Capital Improvement Board, which operates the stadium, estimated that daily operating expenses of the new stadium would be $10 million more per year than the RCA Dome. The board urged the Indiana General Assembly to authorize funding to cover the shortfall. The Indiana Legislature considered a bill to raise sales taxes statewide to cover the shortfall, however this plan faced stiff opposition from legislators outside the Indianapolis metro area.

The assembly ultimately authorized a tax increase in Indianapolis-Marion County. In addition, the CIB trimmed staff and cut $10 million from its budget. Still, the agency anticipated a $20 million operating deficit for Lucas Oil Stadium in 2009. Anticipated expenses are $27.7 million—far outstripping the $7.7 million CIB expects to collect from its share of revenue from stadium events. The Colts organization has been criticized for the favorable lease terms and the high percentage of revenue it can keep under the terms of its agreements with the stadium authorities and there have been calls for the team to cover the shortfalls of the CIB. The Colts responded to these criticisms in an open letter to fans on September 16, 2009.

Complications
On September 8, 2013, after the Colts defeated the Oakland Raiders in the season opener, a rail over the opposing team tunnel collapsed, injuring two fans. One fan was transferred to the hospital for evaluation. No serious injuries were reported.

On September 3, 2015, three fans were injured by a bolt that fell from the roof of the stadium as it was being opened during an NFL preseason game against the Cincinnati Bengals. The stadium was pronounced safe by officials, but the roof remained closed for events until a final investigation was completed as to why the bolt fell.

Construction pictures

See also

List of current National Football League stadiums
List of American football stadiums by capacity
List of music venues
List of attractions and events in Indianapolis
List of tallest buildings in Indianapolis
List of tallest buildings in Indiana

References

External links

American football venues in Indiana
Basketball venues in Indiana
Retractable-roof stadiums in the United States
Indianapolis Colts stadiums
National Football League venues
Sports venues in Indianapolis
Rugby union stadiums in Indiana
2008 establishments in Indiana
Sports venues completed in 2008
Soccer venues in Indiana
Music venues in Indiana
Lucas Oil
NCAA Division I men's basketball tournament Final Four venues
USL Championship stadiums